J. californica  may refer to:
 Juglans californica, the California black walnut, California walnut or the Southern California black walnut, a large shrub or small tree species endemic to California
 Juniperus californica, the California juniper, a tree species mainly found in California
 Justicia californica, the chuparosa, hummingbird bush or beloperone, a flowering shrub species native to the deserts of southern California, Arizona and northern Mexico

See also
 List of Latin and Greek words commonly used in systematic names#C